Asad ibn Hāshim was the son of Hashim ibn Abd Manaf and the brother of Abd al-Muttalib. He was the father of Fatima bint Asad, the mother of Ali and the cousin and wife of Abu Talib. Asad was a very respectful person among the Qureshi Arab tribe. He was a merchant and very often helped the poor. His name means Lion (a brave one). His descendants usually use the surname "Qureshi", "Hashmi" or "al-Hashmi al-Asadi", while some of his descendants avoid using any surname.

Birth
Historians are not clear about his exact date of birth, but according to the sources he was born in 485AD or 497AD in Mecca.

Religion
According to sources he was of a religion of Abraham, as most of the Arabs were of Abraham's religion, including his tribe Quresh and his other uncles. Asad died before the birth of Muhammad.

Brothers and sisters
Abu Saifi bin Hashim
Abd al-Muttalib bin Hashim
Nazil bin Hashim
Nadla binte Hashim
Safia binte Hashim
Shifa binte Hashim
Ruqayya binte Hashim
Khalidah binte Hashim
Hannah binte Hashim
Zaifah binte Hashim
Janna binte Hashim
Ramlah binte Hashim
Hayyah binte Hashim
Da'ifah binte Hashim
Sayfah bin Hashim
Abbas bin Hashim
Abu Sayr bin Hashim

Descendants
Fatimah bint Asad bin Hashim
She was the mother of Caliph Ali and his brothers. Fatimah bint Asad was very dear to Muhammad.

Hunain bin Asad bin Hashim
Hunain was a son of Asad, and he had two sons, Abdullah and Abd-ur Rahman. They both were Sahabi and Abdullah and Abdullah's son name are mentioned in many books of Ahadith. From the sons of Hunain, Abd-ur Rahman was the ancestor of the famous saint of the sub-continent Sheikh-ul-Islam Bahauddin Zakariya. 
 
Adai bint Asad bin Hashim (mother of Haninai al-Nehar Peḳkod ben Bustanai bar Adai, Exilarch and Gaon of Sura, Syria)

Khalda bint Asad bin Hashim (she married her cousin Al-Arqam bin Nazil bin Hashim and had a daughter named Um al-Saaib Al-Shafaa)

Habbar bin Assad bin Hashim (he married his cousin Sa'd bint Abi Sayfi bin Hashim and had a son named Abdul-Rahman bin Habbar)

Death
He died before the birth of Muhammad, and was buried in Jannat al-Mu'alla previously known as Hajoon, in Mecca with his other family members.

References

Sahabah ancestors
Family of Muhammad
Banu Hashim
Najjarite people
5th-century Arabs
Burials at Jannat al-Mu'alla